Nadeenadanmare Avasyamundu is a 1974 Indian Malayalam-language film, directed by Crossbelt Mani and produced by C. P. Sreedharan and P. Appu Nair. The film stars Adoor Bhasi, Thikkurissy Sukumaran Nair, Kottayam Santha and Manavalan Joseph. The film has musical score by R. K. Shekhar.

Cast

Vincent
K. P. Ummer
Sumithra
Rajakokila
Bahadoor
Adoor Bhasi
Thikkurissy Sukumaran Nair
Kottayam Santha
Manavalan Joseph
Sreelatha Namboothiri
Nilambur Balan
Ramdas
A. Madhavan
A. K. Unni
Alummoodan
Girija
Jayakumari
KPAC Sunny
Kuthiravattam Pappu
Mallika Sukumaran
Meena
Paravoor Bharathan
Sadhana
Sibad
T. R. Radhakrishnan
Thresya
Veeran

Soundtrack
The music was composed by R. K. Shekhar and the lyrics were written by Vayalar Ramavarma.

References

External links
 

1974 films
1970s Malayalam-language films
Films directed by Crossbelt Mani